Astatotilapia is a genus of small freshwater fish in the family Cichlidae found in Eastern and Northern Africa, with a single species, A. flaviijosephi, in Western Asia (the only non-African haplochromine). Many species have been moved between this genus and Haplochromis, and while some consensus has been reached in recent years, their mutual delimitation is still far from settled. Based on mtDNA, Astatotilapia as currently defined is polyphyletic.

Species
There are currently 10 recognized species in this genus:

 Astatotilapia bloyeti (Sauvage, 1883)  (Bloyet's haplo)
 Astatotilapia burtoni (Günther, 1894)
 Astatotilapia calliptera (Günther, 1894) (Eastern happy)
 Astatotilapia desfontainii (Lacépède, 1802)
 Astatotilapia flaviijosephi (Lortet, 1883) (Jordan mouthbrooder)
 Astatotilapia paludinosa Greenwood, 1980
 Astatotilapia stappersii (Poll, 1943)
 Astatotilapia swynnertoni (Boulenger, 1907)
 Astatotilapia tchadensis Trape, 2016
 Astatotilapia tweddlei P. B. N. Jackson, 1985

There are a few possibly undescribed species in the genus, such as:	
 Astatotilapia sp. 'dwarf bigeye scraper'
 Astatotilapia sp. 'shovelmouth'

 Names brought to synonymy
 Astatotilapia elegans (Trewavas, 1933), a synonym for Haplochromis elegans

References 

 
Cichlidae
Freshwater fish genera
Taxa named by Jacques Pellegrin